Luxembourg competed at the 2000 Summer Olympics in Sydney, Australia.

Swimming

Men

Women

Table tennis

Tennis

Triathlon

References

Nations at the 2000 Summer Olympics
2000 Summer Olympics
2000 in Luxembourgian sport